Edward A. Newman (January 9, 1853 – May 20, 1909) was a prominent businessman from Portland, Maine, United States. He was general manager of the Portland Railroad Company and vice-president of the New England Street Railway Club. He was well known among the street railway community of the United States, and during his tenure, Portland's streetcar service was recognized as the best in the country.

Life and career 

Newman was the son of Edward Newman, a well-known citizen of the Deering neighborhood of Portland. He had two sisters: Mary and Abbie. His father died in 1898.

He grew up in Westbrook, Maine, where he attended the public school, followed by Westbrook Seminary.

In 1875, he joined, as a clerk, the office of the Portland Railroad Company. The following year, he was elected treasurer of the company, assisting Harrison J. Libby in overseeing the railroad's operation.

Newman succeeded George W. Soule as superintendent.

He was a 32nd-degree Freemason, a member of Deering Lodge, F. and A. M., Portland Commandery, Knights Templar and to Fraternity Lodge, I. O. O. F, of Woodfords.

Death 
Newman died of heart failure on May 20, 1909. He was 56. His funeral, officiated by Rev. Ernest A. Pressey, was held three days later at his Highland Street home, in Woodfords Corner, with over five hundred attendees. At 3.30 PM, all services of the railroad were suspended for two minutes as a mark of respect for Newman.

He is interred in Portland's Evergreen Cemetery. He was joined there by his wife, Marie, who survived him by 24 years. Their daughter, Ethel, followed in 1956.

References 

1853 births
1909 deaths
People from Westbrook, Maine
Businesspeople from Portland, Maine
Westbrook College alumni
American Freemasons
Burials at Evergreen Cemetery (Portland, Maine)